Scartaglen was a Kansas City based Celtic music group, that first formed in the summer of 1982, and produced three albums (all now out of print) before disbanding in the spring of 1994. The group was composed of co-founder Roger Landes (bouzouki, mandolin, tenor banjo, guitar and bodhran), Connie Dover (vocals and keyboard), co-founder Michael Dugger (guitar, tenor banjo, fiddle, vocals), Kirk Lynch (uilleann pipes, flute, tin whistle, guitar and bouzouki).  Earlier line-ups included co-founder David Agee (fiddle, mandolin, tenor banjo, bones and vocals), Kathy Agee (keyboards, flute, tin whistle and vocals), Matthew Kirby (hammer dulcimer),Frank Martin (flute and tin whistle),Dave Brown (bodhran), Keith Van Winkle (fiddle) and Rebecca Pringle (fiddle). Not all of the musicians were in the band at the same time, but all contributed from about 1982 until the band dissolved more than twelve years later. Original tunes were contributed by Landes, Lynch, Dover, Kirby, and Dugger.

Discography
Scartaglen, Kicking Mule Records (1984) (produced by Brian McNeil of Scotland's Battlefield Band) - on LP and cassette
The Middle Path, Castle Island Records (1986) - on LP and cassette
Last Night's Fun, City Spark Records (1992) - on CD and cassette
Chuaigh me 'na Rossan, on Celtic Odyssey, Narada Records (1993) on CD

External links
Roger Landes' official website
Connie Dover's official website
Kirk Lynch's official website

Celtic music groups
Musical groups established in 1982
Narada Productions artists
1982 establishments in the United States